Bonkaram is a village in Qaleh Rural District, in the Central District of Manujan County, Kerman Province, Iran. At the 2006 census, its population was 54, in 8 families.

References 

Populated places in Manujan County